Claymills Pumping Station is a restored Victorian sewage pumping station on the north side of Burton upon Trent, Staffordshire, England.  It was designed by James Mansergh and used to pump sewage to the sewage farm at Egginton.

The main pumping plant consists of four Woolf compound, rotative, beam pumping engines. These are arranged in mirror image pairs, in two separate engine houses, with a central boiler house (containing five Lancashire boilers with economisers) and chimney. The engines were built in 1885 by Gimson and Company of Leicester. All the engines are similar, and the following description is limited to only one, but applicable to all.

The high-pressure cylinder is 24-inch bore by 6-foot stroke, and the low-pressure cylinder is 38-inch bore by 8-foot stroke. Steam is distributed by means of double beat 'Cornish' valves, mounted in upper and lower valve chests. The cylinders act on one end of the beam, via Watt's parallel motion. The beam itself is 26 feet 4 inches between end centres, 4 feet deep at the centre, weighs 13 tons and is carried on  bearings.

Currently B, C and D engines are in steam around 13 times a year, with A engine still in the unrestored state. The Clay Mills Trust has now decided to restore the last unrestored beam engine, A engine.  It will be restored to an operational state taking into consideration its history since last operating in 1969.

The modern sewage works, run by Severn Trent Water, is alongside the pumping station.

See also
Listed buildings in Burton (civil parish)

References

External links

Preservation society web site

Preserved beam engines
Steam museums in England
Museums in Staffordshire
Sewage pumping stations
Infrastructure completed in 1895
Former pumping stations